Parliamentary elections were held in Greece between 24 and 27 November 1862. The elected Parliament was also responsible for drawing up a new constitution. Dimitrios Voulgaris became Prime Minister on 23 December as head of the Provisional Government.

References

Greece
1862
1862 in Greece
November 1862 events
1860s in Greek politics